St. Jean Baptiste 2010 is a French language digital compilation by Canadian grindcore band Fuck the Facts.  It is in celebration of the national holiday in Quebec.

Release
Fuck the Facts made this compilation available free during the St. Jean Baptiste celebration on June 23 and 24.  Their MySpace, Facebook, and Bandcamp pages displayed the following message:

Track listing

Track details
The compilation spans approximately seven years of recording by the band.

External links
St. Jean Baptiste 2010 on Bandcamp

References

2010 compilation albums
Fuck the Facts albums
Self-released albums
Grindcore compilation albums
Death metal compilation albums